Hugh Innes may refer to:

Sir Hugh Innes, 1st Baronet (c. 1764–1831), British Member of Parliament
Hugh Paterson Innes (1870–1931), Ontario lawyer, judge and political figure